Liang Shaowen (born 12 June 2002) is a Chinese footballer currently playing for Beijing Guoan as a left-footed centre-back.

Club career 
Born in Weinan, a city in the Chinese province of Shaanxi, Liang joined the youth sector of Beijing Guoan before being promoted to their senior team. To gain more time he would be loaned out to the China U19 team who were allowed to take part in the third tier of the Chinese pyramid. On his return in June 2021, despite not having registered a single league appearance with the Beijing's first team, yet, he was given an opportunity to shine on a continental level, as Beijing and the other Chinese teams involved in the AFC Champions League group stage sent a mix of reserves and youth players to the centralized venues: in fact, most of the senior players were still dealing with self-isolating measures to contrast COVID-19 following international matches, so the clubs involved chose to keep them in China, valuing performances in the national top-tier league over ACL fixtures.

So, on June 26, 2021, Liang ended up making his professional debut in unusual circumstances, captaining his side (led by youth coach Zoran Janković) against Filipino side United City at just 19 years old. Still, he managed to score his first senior goal for the club (a curled free-kick at the 73rd minute of the game) to help Beijing's inexperienced squad gain a surprising 1-1 final draw. After his return from the continental competition he would go on to make his league debut on 29 December 2021 against Shandong Taishan F.C. in a 1-1 draw.

International career 
Liang has represented China PR at several youth ranks.

Career statistics

Club
.

References

External links
Liang Shaowen at Worldfootball.net

2002 births
Living people
Chinese footballers
China youth international footballers
Association football defenders
Beijing Guoan F.C. players